Viktorin is both a surname and a given name. Notable people with the name include:

Alison Viktorin (born 1981), American actress and voice actress
Viktorin Hallmayer (1831–1872), Austrian composer and band conductor
Viktorin Kornel of Všehrdy (1460-1520), Czech humanist and lawyer
Viktorin Molchanov (1886–1975), Russian general and anti-communist
Viktorin Hallmayer (1831–1872), Austrian composer and conductor

See also
Wiktoryn (disambiguation)